Yves Feys (born 16 January 1969 in Torhout) is a retired Belgian professional football goalkeeper. He has played most of his career for Cercle Brugge.

Club career
Feys started playing football at age 9 with top level team Cercle Brugge. He stayed with the green and black side until they relegated to the second division. He went to Excelsior Mouscron. In the last season with the Hainaut side, Feys wasn't given much play time. As a result, Feys returned to his roots. Feys became back-up goalie for Björn Sengier.

After this quite disappointing season for Feys, he decided to try his luck with Jupiler League side FC Antwerp. Feys ended his career with Deinze.

Yves Feys won the Cercle Brugge Pop Poll three consecutive times.

Retirement
During and after his career, Feys was active in the building industry.

External links
Cerclemuseum.be 
Profile - FC Antwerp

1969 births
Living people
People from Torhout
Association football goalkeepers
Belgian footballers
Cercle Brugge K.S.V. players
Royal Excel Mouscron players
Royal Antwerp F.C. players
Belgian Pro League players
K.M.S.K. Deinze players
Footballers from West Flanders